The 1992–93 Estonian Cup was the third season of the Estonian football knockout tournament after 54 year pause. Nikol Tallinn won the title and qualified for the 1993–94 European Cup Winners' Cup.

References

Estonian Cup seasons
Cup
Cup
Estonian